Indra Kumari Devi was the first wife of Prithvi Narayan Shah, King of Nepal. Born to Hem Karna Sen, King of Makwanpur, she was married to Shah in February 1738, at the age of 14. During the wedding ceremony, a conflict arose, subsequently he went home without a bride. She with other wives of Prithvi Narayan Shah committed sati on 11 January 1775 in Devighat.

References

Citation

Bibliography 

 
 
 
 
 

Nepalese queens consort
1775 deaths
People of the Nepalese unification
Nepalese Hindus
People who committed sati
18th-century Nepalese people
18th-century Nepalese nobility
People from Makwanpur District